Bano railway station, station code BANO, is the railway station serving the village of Bano in the Simdega district in the Indian state of Jharkhand. Bano Station belongs to the Ranchi division of the South Eastern Railway zone of the Indian Railways.

Facilities 
The major facilities available are waiting rooms, retiring room, computerized reservation facility, reservation counter, vehicle parking etc. The vehicles are allowed to enter the station premises. Security personnel from the Government Railway Police (G.R.P.) are present for security. A Railway medical unit providing health facilities is located near Bano station.

Platforms
The platforms are interconnected with foot overbridge (FOB).

Trains 
Several electrified local passenger trains and express trains run from Bano to neighbouring destinations. Many passenger and express trains serve Bano station.

Nearest airports
The nearest airports to Bano station are

 Birsa Munda Airport, Ranchi 
 Gaya Airport, Gaya 
 Lok Nayak Jayaprakash Airport, Patna 
 Netaji Subhash Chandra Bose International Airport, Kolkata

References

External links 
 Bano station map
 Official website of the Simdega district

Railway stations in Simdega district
Ranchi railway division